Camille Barbaud (14 July 1900 – 16 December 1996) was a French athlete. He competed in the men's 3000 metres team race event at the 1924 Summer Olympics.

References

External links
 

1900 births
1996 deaths
Athletes (track and field) at the 1924 Summer Olympics
French male middle-distance runners
Olympic athletes of France
People from Gien
Sportspeople from Loiret